St. Michael's Cathedral is an Orthodox church located in Cherkasy in central Ukraine. The church was constructed in 2000. It belongs to the Ukrainian Orthodox Church (Moscow Patriarchate). It is one of the biggest in Ukraine, and can hold up to 12,000 worshipers at one time.

See also
 List of large Orthodox cathedrals

References

Cherkasy
Ukrainian Orthodox Church (Moscow Patriarchate) cathedrals
Buildings and structures in Cherkasy
Tourist attractions in Cherkasy Oblast